Il buco is a 2021 Italian drama film directed by Michelangelo Frammartino. It was selected to compete for the Golden Lion at the 78th Venice International Film Festival, and won the Special Jury Prize.

The film tells the story of the August 1961 discovery and exploration of the almost 700-metre deep Bifurto Abyss in the caves of Pollino in southern Italy.

Accolades

References

External links
 
 Il Buco on Coproduction Office official website

2021 films
2021 drama films
Italian drama films
2020s Italian-language films
Venice Special Jury Prize winners
2020s Italian films